Symmetrischema loquax is a moth in the family Gelechiidae. It was described by Edward Meyrick in 1917. It is found in Peru.

Description 
The wingspan is 9–10 mm. The forewings are dark grey sprinkled with whitish, tinged here and there with ochreous. There is a black dot beneath the costa near the base, and two or three other indistinct ones on the basal area. A small black costal spot is found before one-third. Sometimes, there are ochreous subcostal dashes before and beyond this. The stigmata are moderate or large, ochreous brownish, sometimes accompanied by a few blackish scales, and with the plical slightly before the first discal. A blackish dot is found on the fold beneath the middle of the wing. There is a small cloudy darker spot on the costa at two-thirds and a cloudy darker dot above the tornus, as well as a cloudy spot of dark fuscous suffusion on the termen above the tornus and an elongate blackish mark in the disc near the apex. The hindwings are slaty grey.

References

Symmetrischema
Moths described in 1917